The 1933 Alabama Crimson Tide football team (variously "Alabama", "UA" or "Bama") represented the University of Alabama in the 1933 college football season. It was the Crimson Tide's 40th overall and 1st season as a member of the Southeastern Conference (SEC). The team was led by head coach Frank Thomas, in his third year, and played their home games at Denny Stadium in Tuscaloosa and Legion Field in Birmingham, Alabama. They finished the season with a record of seven wins, one loss and one tie (7–1–1 overall, 5–0–1 in the SEC), and as the first SEC champions.

One week later, the Crimson Tide defeated Mississippi State for their first ever SEC victory and followed that with their first ever SEC road victory with their win over Tennessee at Shields–Watkins Field. From Knoxville, Alabama traveled to New York City where they lost their only game of the season against Fordham in an intersectional matchup. Alabama rebounded with four consecutive victories to close the season as conference champions with wins over Kentucky, VPI (Virginia Tech) on homecoming, Georgia Tech and Vanderbilt.

Before the season
In December 1932, after the conclusion of the 1932 season, Alabama withdrew from the Southern Conference to become a charter member of the SEC. The Crimson Tide was joined by Auburn, Florida, Georgia, Georgia Tech, Kentucky, LSU, Mississippi, Mississippi State, Sewanee, Tennessee, Tulane and Vanderbilt. Effective the start of the 1933 season, the SEC was formed in an effort to create a smaller, geographically closer conference.

Schedule

Game summaries

Oglethorpe

Source:

Although they played most of the game in a heavy rainstorm, Alabama opened the 1933 season with a 34–0 victory over Oglethorpe at Denny Stadium. The Crimson Tide took a 14–0 first quarter lead on a 12-yard Frank Moseley touchdown pass to Dixie Howell and a two-yard James McDanal touchdown run. With the lead, Alabama pulled their starters and played their second string for the second quarter. In the second, they took a 21–0 lead on a 21-yard Howard Chappell touchdown run. In the second half, the Crimson Tide closed the game with a touchdown in each of the final two quarters. McDanal scored first on a short run followed by a 12-yard Chappell run for the 34–0 win. The victory improved Alabama's all-time record against Oglethorpe to 2–0.

Ole Miss

Source:

In what was the first SEC game ever played by the Crimson Tide, Alabama and the rival Ole Miss Rebels battled to a 0–0 tie at Legion Field. Although Alabama outgained the Rebels in total offense 179 to 33 yards, seven fumbles kept the Crimson Tide out of the end zone. The tie brought Alabama's all-time record against Ole Miss 16–2–2.

Mississippi State

Source:

Against their long-time rival, the Mississippi State Maroons, Alabama won their first all-time SEC game 18–0 at Denny Stadium. In the game, Frank Moseley scored on a pair of touchdown runs with Dixie Howell scoring the other in the third quarter on a seven-yard run in the victory. The victory improved Alabama's all-time record against Mississippi State 16–4–2.

Tennessee

Source:

Against rival Tennessee, Alabama defeated the Volunteers, 12–6 at Shields–Watkins Field. After a scoreless first quarter, the Volunteers took a 6–0 lead in the second when Beattie Feathers scored on a touchdown run. Down six at the half, a pair of second half touchdowns gave the Crimson Tide the 12–6 victory. Erskine Walker scored in the third on a 34-yard run and Dixie Howell scored the game-winning touchdown in the fourth on a four-yard run. The loss was the first at home for Tennessee in the Robert Neyland era. The victory improved Alabama's all-time record against Tennessee 10–5–1.

Fordham

Source:

Before 60,000 fans at the Polo Grounds in New York City, Alabama was defeated the Fordham Rams, 2–0. The only points scored in the game came in the first quarter when Amerino Sarno blocked a Dixie Howell punt that Howell recovered in the endzone for a Fordham safety. The loss was Alabama's first intersectional loss since their 15–0 defeat against Wisconsin in 1928, and brought Alabama's all-time record against Fordham 0–1.

Kentucky

Source:

A week after their first loss of the season, Alabama defeated the Kentucky Wildcats 20–0 at Legion Field. After a scoreless first quarter, the Crimson Tide took a 6–0 in the second after Dixie Howell scored on a 55-yard touchdown run. Alabama then closed the game with a five-yard Howell touchdown run in the third and a short Joe Demyanovich touchdown run in the fourth for the 20–0 win. In the first quarter, Howell punted the football 89-yards, which still stands as the Alabama record for longest punt. The victory improved Alabama's all-time record against Kentucky 12–1.

VPI

Source:

Against the Fighting Gobblers of VPI (now known as the Virginia Tech Hokies), Alabama won 27–0 on homecoming at Denny Field. The Crimson Tide took a 6–0 first quarter lead after Riley Smith scored on a five-yard touchdown run. They extended their lead to 18–0 at halftime on touchdown runs of one-yard by Joe Demyanovich and ten-yards by James Angelich in the second quarter. Alabama then closed the game with a 16-yard Dixie Howell touchdown run and a tackle of the Gobblers' Ray Mills for a safety in the third for the 27–0 win. The victory improved Alabama's all-time record against VPI 2–0.

Georgia Tech

Source:

Against the Georgia Tech Golden Tornado, Alabama won 12–9 at Grant Field. The Crimson Tide took a 6–0 lead in the first quarter on a Dixie Howell touchdown run. After a Howell fumble resulted in a safety in the second, Tech took a 9–6 lead in the third quarter when W. A. Davis scored on a one-yard touchdown run. Howell then scored the game-winning touchdown in the fourth quarter on a short run.  The victory improved Alabama's all-time record against Georgia Tech to 7–10–2.

Vanderbilt

Source:

In the season finale at Vanderbilt, Alabama defeated the Commodores 7–0 to capture the first SEC championship. The only points of the game came on a short Dixie Howell touchdown run in the second quarter. The victory improved Alabama's all-time record against Vanderbilt to 6–8.

Personnel

Varsity letter winners

Coaching staff

References
General

 

Specific

Alabama
Alabama Crimson Tide football seasons
Southeastern Conference football champion seasons
Alabama Crimson Tide football